Suzanne (Sue) Salisbury is an American politician from Maine. Salisbury, a Democrat from Westbrook, Maine, is a member of the Maine House of Representatives. She represents the 35th House District, and serves on the Education and Cultural Affairs Committee. She owns a coffee shop and serves as the Chair on the Westbrook School Board. Salisbury also runs the Westbrook Families Feeding Families food pantry which was started by her and her mother.

References 

Year of birth missing (living people)
Living people
School board members in Maine
Democratic Party members of the Maine House of Representatives
21st-century American politicians
21st-century American women politicians
Women state legislators in Maine